The First Presbyterian Church of Champaign, Illinois is the oldest church in Champaign.

History 
The history of Champaign, the University of Illinois at Urbana–Champaign and First Presbyterian Church are interlinked, even though First Presbyterian Church congregation organized 17 years prior to the University of Illinois receiving its charter. At that time, Champaign was little more than a swamp known as 'West Urbana'.

In 1867, a Presbyterian congregation of 137 erected the current sanctuary, the distinctive second floor "Upper Room" being considered a testament to their vision. In the same year the State of Illinois chartered the Illinois Industrial University (which later came to be known as the University of Illinois).

See also

List of Presbyterian churches in the United States

References

External links
 First Presbyterian Church of Champaign Web Site
 City of Champaign Web Site
 University of Illinois at Urbana-Champaign Main Page
 City of Champaign Maps

1850 establishments in Illinois
Buildings and structures in Champaign, Illinois
Presbyterian churches in Illinois
Religious organizations established in 1850